Gavirate is a comune (municipality) in the Province of Varese in the Italian region of Lombardy, located about  northwest of Milan and about  northwest of Varese.

The municipality of Gavirate contains the frazioni (hamlets) Oltrona al Lago, Voltorre and other mainly villages: Groppello, Le Vigne, Fignano, Forte di Orino, Fienile delle Pianezze, Armino, Pozzuolo, Cual, Ca'de Monti, Ronco, and Benedetto.

Gavirate borders the following municipalities: Barasso, Bardello, Besozzo, Biandronno, Casciago, Cocquio-Trevisago, Comerio, Cuvio, Varese.

Demographic evolution

References

External links
 www.comune.gavirate.va.it/

Cities and towns in Lombardy